The Calcaire à Spatangues (French for: "limestone with Spatangus") is a geological formation in the Paris basin of northern central France whose strata date back to the Early Cretaceous. Dinosaur remains are among the fossils that have been recovered from the formation.

Vertebrate paleofauna
 Mantellisaurus atherfieldensis

See also

 List of dinosaur-bearing rock formations

References

Lower Cretaceous Series of Europe
Hauterivian Stage